The College of Idaho (C of I) is a private liberal arts college in Caldwell, Idaho. Founded in 1891, it is the state's oldest private liberal arts college and has an enrollment of over 1,000 students. The college's alumni include eight Rhodes Scholars, three governors, four professional football players, and one professional baseball player. Its PEAK Curriculum allows students to study in four knowledge areas - humanities, natural sciences, social sciences, and a professional field - and earn a major and three minors in four years.

History
The college was conceived in 1884 when the Presbyterian Church's Wood River Presbytery, meeting in Shoshone, formed a commission to examine the possibility of establishing a Presbyterian college somewhere in the Idaho Territory. The commission found support for such a venture and in 1890 the Presbytery accepted an offer from a group of Caldwell citizens led by William Judson Boone, to locate the institution in that community.

The college was founded  in 1891 by Dr. Rev. William Judson Boone with the support of the Wood River Presbytery. The college first opened its doors to students on October 7, 1891. Nineteen students showed up at The College of Idaho for the first classes in 1891. The first classes were held downtown in the Caldwell Presbyterian Church. A year later the college moved into its own downtown building before moving to its present site on the east side of town in 1910 when Henry and Carrie Blatchley donated  of land. Sterry Hall, a classroom and administration building, and Finney Hall, the first residence hall, were built that year. Two years later Voorhees residence hall was built, which would be the second of five total residents halls. 

In 1893, it was incorporated under the laws of the State of Idaho and placed in the hands of a self-perpetuating board of trustees. Dr. Boone served as president of the college for 45 years until his death in 1936.

In 1991, the college's board of trustees unanimously voted to change its name to Albertson College of Idaho to honor alumnus and long-time donor Joe Albertson  and his wife Kathryn  The couple, who founded one of the country's largest supermarket chains, Albertson's Inc., met in a chemistry class at C of I and were generous benefactors of the college. At the time of the name change, the enrollment was 

On October 10, 2007, college president Bob Hoover announced that the name would revert to The College of Idaho, with the mutual agreement of the J.A. and Kathryn Albertson Foundation, to promote acceptance and gain financial backing from alumni who were unhappy about the original name change. This coincided with a  donation by the foundation to the college.

Academics
The college offers 26 undergraduate majors, 58 undergraduate minors, three graduate programs, and a variety of collaborative programs through 16 departments. Popular majors include Biology, Business, History, Psychology, and Political Economy.

Academic departments

Biology
Chemistry
Health & Human Performance
Mathematical and Physical Sciences
Art
English
Modern Languages
Music
Philosophy and Religion
Theatre & Speech Arts
Anthropology & Sociology
Business & Accounting
Education
History
Political Economy
Psychology

Accreditation
The college has been accredited by the Northwest Commission on Colleges and Universities since 1922. Its teacher education program has been approved by the Idaho State Department of Education since 1913, and its graduates are eligible for certification in all states participating in the Interstate Certification Compact. The college is accepted by, and the alumnae are eligible for, membership in the American Association of University Women (AAUW).

Collaborative programs
Collaborative programs between The College of Idaho and other institutions offer degrees from both with students spending three to four years at C of I and two to three years at the cooperating university.

Collaborative programs in health professions include: nursing, clinical lab science, speech and language pathology and audiology, physical therapy, occupational therapy, pharmacy, pharmaceutical science and public health.

Other collaborative programs include engineering and law.

PEAK undergraduate curriculum
PEAK is the college's unique undergraduate curriculum. It is intended to allow students to graduate with an academic major and three minors in four years or two majors and minors if they choose. The curriculum was implemented in the Fall of 2010. It is made up of four different peaks: humanities & fine arts, social sciences & history, natural sciences & mathematics, and professional studies & enhancement. Each student under this curriculum is required to major in one of the four peaks, while minoring in the other three allowing a broad base of study with limited general education requirements.

Academic calendar
The academic calendar provides opportunities for experimental as well as conventional approaches to learning. During the fall and spring terms traditionally formatted courses are offered over a twelve-week term. Each twelve-week term is segmented by a one-week break in the middle of the term, usually following midterms. Between the fall and spring terms, a four-week winter session is offered that stresses experimentation, innovation, creative teaching, and imaginative learning using tutorials, seminars, or independent research methods. Before the PEAK Curriculum was implemented in the Fall of 2010, the winter session was six weeks long.

Student life
The college has more than 50 student clubs and organizations, with an active student government, the Associated Students of The College of Idaho and emphasizes diversity in cultures(ASCI) and strong intramural and club sports programs. Intramural sports include: basketball, soccer, softball and flag football.

The college's Outdoor Program takes advantage of Idaho's geography and include backpacking, hiking, fly fishing, camping, winter camping, snowshoeing, kayaking, rafting, rock climbing, backcountry skiing, inner tubing, and stargazing. The Outdoor Program leads week-long trips during the breaks between terms and after midterms.

Other student organizations include Amnesty International, TERRA, Campus Ministries, the Gender and Sexuality Campus Alliance, Finance Club, etc. Some of the most popular clubs include the Association of Latin American Students, the International Student Organization, and African Friends, Relative, Others. 

The college has one fraternity, Sigma Chi and three sororities: Kappa Alpha Theta, Kappa Kappa Gamma, and Sigma Epsilon.

Athletics
The College of Idaho (CofI) athletic teams are called the Coyotes (or Yotes). The college is a member of the National Association of Intercollegiate Athletics (NAIA), primarily competing in the Cascade Collegiate Conference (CCC) for most of its sports since the 1993–94 academic year; while its football team competes in the Frontier Conference, its men's lacrosse team competes in the Pacific Northwest Collegiate Lacrosse League (PNCLL), its men's and women's skiing competes in the Northwest Collegiate Ski Conference (NWCSC) of the United States Collegiate Ski and Snowboard Association (USCSA), and its competitive swimming team competes as an Independent.

CofI competes in 20 intercollegiate varsity sports: Men's sports include baseball, basketball, cross country, football, golf, lacrosse, skiing, soccer, swimming & diving and track & field; while women's sports include basketball, cross country, golf, skiing, soccer, softball, swimming & diving, tennis, track & field and volleyball.

Football
In 2014, The College of Idaho re-instated its football program after a 37-year hiatus. The program is led by head coach Mike Moroski, who has posted a record of 53-38 since taking over the program and was voted the 2019 Frontier Conference Coach of the Year. From 2019-2022, the Yotes have posted a record of 29-7 and have won a at least a share of the Frontier Conference each year. The Yotes even posted their longest winning streak in school history from 2018-2019 (17 games). Even so, the Yotes have only reached the NAIA playoffs once in those four years (2019).  In 2019, the Yotes posted their best record of 11-1 and achieved their highest rank in program history at #5 in the NAIA postseason poll. Since 2014, the Yotes have had a total of 8 All-Americans, 56 all-conference selections, and 26 NAIA All-Academic selections. In 2022, the Yotes split the conference title with rival Carroll College and finished the season ranked 18th in the nation after posting an 8-2 record.

Mascot
The Coyote is the school's mascot, but CofI teams are often referred to as the "Yotes."

Accomplishments
Since 2011, CofI student-athletes have won 23 national championships. The men's and women's ski teams have won 48 individual and team national championships while competing in the NWCSC of the USCSA. The college's track and cross country teams have won 13 individual and relay national titles. The men's baseball team has qualified for postseason play every year since 1987, winning the NAIA national championship in 1998. The men's basketball team won the 1996 NAIA Division II national championship. In 2014, the CofI football team ranked No. 2 in the NAIA for attendance with more than 4,500 fans per game. The men's lacrosse team has also won back to back PNCLL D II conference championships, in 2018 and 2019.

All 19 of the College of Idaho's NAIA teams were honored as NAIA Scholar Team for 2008–2009 season. Each team maintained an average GPA of at least 3.0. This set an all-time NAIA record for number of Scholar Teams in one season. CofI student-athletes continue to earn high marks in the class room and are among the annual leaders in scholar-athlete and academic All-America honorees.

During 2019–2021, the College of Idaho football team won three straight Frontier Conference championships in the NAIA. This includes the unprecedented "COVID" season in the spring of 2021 where the "Yotes" played just four games.

In 2023, the College of Idaho's men's basketball team, under head coach Colby Blaine, won its second NAIA national championship, defeating Indiana Tech 73-71 in Kansas City, Missouri. The 2022-2023 team went 35-1 and 22-0 in Cascade Conference play, winning 35 straight games after losing its opening game of the season.

National Championships

Orma J. Smith Museum of Natural History
The College of Idaho houses the Orma J. Smith Museum of Natural History in William Judson Boone Science Hall. It is the only natural history museum for southwestern Idaho, southeastern Oregon, and northern Nevada. The natural history museum serves three main purposes: to support the educational programs at The College of Idaho, to provide a resource to the community, and to house resources for scientific research.

Orma J. Smith taught chemistry, zoology, and geology in the early 1900s. A small museum was established in the 1930s to house his collections but was closed in 1963. It was reopened in 1976 in the basement of Boone Hall, driven by the need to house collections from the College of Idaho expeditions led by Dr. Robert Bratz and the current director, William H. Clark.

Since the ‘70s, the Museum has been staffed primarily by volunteers, many the College of Idaho alums, and students. The first Saturday is dedicated to Museum Workdays, where the museum is open for work with Museum staff. A monthly education seminar takes place at noon on Workdays.

The museum is a repository for some very large regional collections.

The students in the Gipson Honors Program utilize the museum every year for a first semester project, writing research papers which are supposed to offer a unique perspective on one item in the extensive collections.

Archives
The personal papers of Robert E. Smylie and the legislative papers of former senator Steve Symms are located at the college. The Steunenberg Papers, detailing Idaho's Trial of the Century, were recently donated to the Archives. The College of Idaho archivist is photographic artist/historian Jan Boles (College of Idaho '65).

Idaho's Gem and Mineral Collection is located at the Orma J. Smith Natural History Museum at the college.

Community involvement
Jewett Auditorium hosts the Caldwell Fine Arts Series which was founded in 1961 as a co-operative effort between the college and community leaders to present world class events and artists. The performances sponsored by the Caldwell Fine Arts Series have included a wide variety of disciplines: solo artists, chamber music, orchestra, theater, opera, ballet, ethnic dance and jazz. Jewett Auditorium was built to house a three manual pipe organ donated by the Jewett family. The interior of the auditorium was designed for acoustical excellence and seats 850 people. The building was completed in 1962 with funds from the Presbyterian Synod of Idaho and the Jewett Foundation. Jewett Auditorium also serves as the home stage of Music Theatre of Idaho and Dreamweaver Musical Theatre.

Langroise Trio
The College of Idaho Langroise Trio was founded in 1991 from the Gladys Langroise Advised Fund. Samuel Smith, David Johnson, and Geoffrey Trabichoff make up the trio as artists-in-residence at The College of Idaho. Samuel Smith has been principal cellist of the Ft. Wayne Philharmonic where he was a frequent soloist and a member of the Freimann Quartet. Samuel was also a cellist for the Grant Park Symphony of Chicago. He has served as assistant principal cellist of the Florida Symphony, and has been on the adjunct faculty at Anderson College and the summer faculty at Ball State University. David Johnson has been principal violist of the Iceland Symphony and the Ft. Wayne Philharmonic, and a member of the Freimann Quartet. David was assistant principal violist for the Grant Park Symphony in Chicago and holds a Master of Music degree from Indiana University. He has been a featured soloist on numerous occasions and a featured artist on Iceland National Radio Broadcasts. Geoffrey Trabichoff is Concertmaster of the Boise Philharmonic. He is the former concertmaster of the BBC Scottish Symphony and former leader of the Paragon Ensemble of Scotland. Geoffrey has broadcast numerous concertos for the BBC. He has been guest concertmaster of the Royal Philharmonic and the London Symphony as well as the Northern Sinfonia, BBC Welsh and BBC Philharmonic Orchestras. He also served as concertmaster of the Mannheim Chamber and Hanover State Orchestras in Germany.

Notable alumni
 Joe Albertson, founder of Albertson's supermarkets and philanthropist
 Kathryn Albertson, wife of the founder of the Albertsons chain of grocery stores; philanthropist and founder of local sorority Sigma Epsilon
 Elgin Baylor, Basketball Hall of Fame inductee 
 Andy Benoit, sports journalist; covers the NFL for Sports Illustrated
 Cary Coglianese, University of Pennsylvania Law School faculty leader and author 
 Christopher Farnsworth, novelist
 Warren Jones , justice of the Idaho Supreme Court
 Larry Lujack, Chicago radio host
 Butch Otter, 32nd governor of Idaho (2007 to 2019)
 R.C. Owens, NFL wide receiver for the San Francisco 49ers, Baltimore Colts, and New York Giants
Alison Rabe, attorney and member of the Idaho Senate
 Klaus Scharioth, former German ambassador to the United States
 Gerald Schroeder, former chief justice of the Idaho Supreme Court
 Mary Shaw Shorb, research scientist, invented first method to assay Vitamin B-12
 Elmo Smith, 27th governor of Oregon (1956 to 1957)
 Paul Smith, Academy Award-winning composer
 Robert Smylie, 24th governor of Idaho (1955 to 1967)
 Kristine Tompkins, co-founder of Patagonia and founder of Conservacion Patagonica

References

External links
 
 Official athletics website

 
Liberal arts colleges in Idaho
Educational institutions established in 1891
Cascade Collegiate Conference
Presbyterianism in Idaho
Universities and colleges accredited by the Northwest Commission on Colleges and Universities
Universities and colleges affiliated with the Presbyterian Church (USA)
Buildings and structures in Canyon County, Idaho
Tourist attractions in Canyon County, Idaho
1891 establishments in Idaho
Private universities and colleges in Idaho